Benjamin Khor Cheng Jie (born 16 February 1993 in United Kingdom) is a double trap shooter who represents Malaysia. His father, Edward who he says is also the most influential person in his career, has represented Malaysia in shooting and encouraged Benjamin to take up the sport.

References

1993 births
Living people
Trap and double trap shooters
Malaysian male sport shooters
Place of birth missing (living people)
Shooters at the 2010 Asian Games
Shooters at the 2014 Asian Games
Commonwealth Games bronze medallists for Malaysia
Shooters at the 2010 Commonwealth Games
Commonwealth Games medallists in shooting
Southeast Asian Games gold medalists for Malaysia
Southeast Asian Games medalists in shooting
Competitors at the 2017 Southeast Asian Games
Asian Games competitors for Malaysia
Medallists at the 2010 Commonwealth Games